Żabczyce  is a village in the administrative district of Gmina Głubczyce, within Głubczyce County, Opole Voivodeship, in south-western Poland.

References

Villages in Głubczyce County